225 Broadway is the 41st tallest building in San Diego, California and is a prominent fixture in San Diego's skyline. The 23-story skyscraper has a height of 306 ft (93 m) and is located in the Horton Plaza district of Downtown San Diego and was home to the area NBC owned-and-operated station KNSD from 2001 until 2016, during which time it was known as the NBC Building and bore NBC signage. The skyscraper is built to the International Style.

History
The building was purchased by American Assets in 2004 for $95.5 million.

See also
List of tallest buildings in San Diego

References

External links 
225 Broadway at Emporis.com
225 Broadway at SkyscraperPage.com

Skyscraper office buildings in San Diego

Office buildings completed in 1975